Big Pond (The Place To Be) is a  lake located in Otis, Massachusetts. The lake is popular for boating, swimming, fishing, water skiing, snowmobiling, camping, and water-related recreation. Fish include lake trout, bass, white perch, yellow perch, catfish, and bluegills. Big Pond is stocked with trout by the Massachusetts Division of Fisheries & Wildlife.

The Big Pond Association ( www.bigpondassociation.com ) is a 501c3 non-profit that oversees a number of activities throughout the year. In addition, the association has an active weed watcher program to identify invasive plant species and raises awareness of the threat.

References

Lakes of Berkshire County, Massachusetts
Lakes of Hampden County, Massachusetts
Buildings and structures in Berkshire County, Massachusetts
Buildings and structures in Hampden County, Massachusetts
Tourist attractions in Berkshire County, Massachusetts
Tourist attractions in Hampden County, Massachusetts
Lakes of Massachusetts